Tamati Clarke (born 12 February 1990) is a New Zealand cricketer. He made two List A appearances for Northern Districts in 2013. He was part of New Zealand's squad for the 2008 Under-19 Cricket World Cup.

References

External links
 

1990 births
Living people
New Zealand cricketers
Northern Districts cricketers
Cricketers from Auckland